Norman Howard Christ (born 22 December 1943 in Pittsburgh) is a physicist and a professor at Columbia University, where he holds the Ephraim Gildor Professorship of Computational Theoretical Physics. He is notable for his research in Lattice QCD.

Work and life 
Norman Christ graduated Salutatorian with a B.A. in physics  from Columbia in 1965 and received his Ph.D. from the same institution in 1966 under Nobel Laureate Tsung-Dao Lee.  Christ became a professor at Columbia after graduation, and has remained there since.  He is also a leading researcher at Brookhaven National Laboratory.

Norman's research lies in the fields of Lattice QCD, which simulates strong interaction among quarks and gluons with monte carlo method. He worked on various topic in this field, such as the phenomena of quark confinement, the spontaneous chiral magnetization of the vacuum  and the quark-gluon plasma. In recent years, he is mostly interested in the Kaon physics, such as the kaon mass difference, the rare kaon decay and most importantly the direct and indirect CP violation parameter.

Supercomputer and physics 
Lattice QCD is extremely computational intensive. The simulation is usually performed on the state-of-the-art supercomputer. Instead of purchasing commercial machines, Norman chose to build supercomputers with his colleagues at Columbia University. The lattice group at Columbia pioneered the construction of highly parallel machines dedicated to QCD calculations in 1982, and produced a series of three successful machines between 1985 and 1989 which were used to obtain a variety of new results in QCD. During this period there were also a number of other dedicated computer projects with similar goals carried out in Italy (the APE Project), Japan (QCD-PAX), and Fermilab (ACP-MAPS) and IBM (GF11) in the U. S.

In 1993, Norman started the QCDSP project, aiming to build a Teraflops supercomputer. The first working hardware was available in August 1995, and a working 6 Gflops machine in July 1996. A 400 Gflops and another 600 Gflops machine are completed in 1998. Norman and his collaborators won the prestigious Gordon Bell Prize in 1998 for designing the QCDSP supercomputer. The next project led by Norman was the QCDOC supercomputers. The computers were designed and built jointly by University of Edinburgh, Columbia University, the RIKEN BNL Brookhaven Research Center and IBM. The target was to build a massively parallel supercomputer able to peak at 10 Tflops with sustained power at 50% capacity. At the end of 2005, there were three QCDOCs in service each reaching 10 Tflops peak operation. QCDOC is considered the precursor of IBM's Blue Gene L machine. After QCDOC, although Norman still collaborated closely with IBM in developing the Blue Gene supercomputers, he was no longer playing a leading role in these projects.

Publications

 All publications from the INSPIRE-HEP literature database.

External links
 Norman Christ's Columbia faculty homepage
 Christ's Doctoral Dissertation – "Possible Tests of the Cst and Tst Invariance of Electromagnetic Phenomena."
 PARTICLE PHYSICS: Monster Machines – Science, 16 May 2003
 Computing the Quarks, Symmetry magazine, November 2005

Living people
21st-century American physicists
Columbia College (New York) alumni
Columbia University faculty
Scientists from Pittsburgh
Brookhaven National Laboratory staff
1943 births
Members of JASON (advisory group)